Here are the match results of the 2008 Rugby union season.
Qualifiers for the 2011 Rugby World Cup began in the Caribbean, meanwhile the Six Nations Championship and the Tri Nations are set for another season.

International tournaments

Worldwide
Nations Cup — Winner:  Emerging Springboks
2008 IRB Junior World Championship — Winner: 
2008 IRB Junior World Rugby Trophy — Winner: 
2007-08 IRB Sevens World Series — Winner:

Africa

2008 Africa Cup/2011 Rugby World Cup - Africa qualification — Winner: -
2008 Castel Beer Trophy - Southern Development — Winner: .
2008 Castel Beer Trophy - Southern Pool — Winner: 
2008 Castel Beer Trophy - Northern Pool — Winner:

Asia
2008 Asian Five Nations Cup — Winner: 
2008 Asian Five Nations - Division One — Winner: 
2008 Asian Five Nations - Division Two — Winner: 
2008 Asian Five Nations - South-East Asia — 
2008 Asian Five Nations - Pacific-Asia — 
2008 Asian Five Nations - Central Asia — 
2008 Asian Five Nations - Other Regions
2011 Rugby World Cup - Asia qualification

Europe
2008 Six Nations Championship — Winner: 
2007-2008 European Nations Cup First Division — Winner: 
2007-2008 European Nations Cup Division 2A — Winner: 
2007-2008 European Nations Cup Division 2B — Winner: 
2007-2008 European Nations Cup Division 3A — Winner: 
2007-2008 European Nations Cup Division 3B —  Winner: 
2007-2008 European Nations Cup Division 3C —  Winner: 
2007-2008 European Nations Cup Division 3D —  Winner: 
2011 Rugby World Cup - Europe qualification

North America

 2008 Churchill Cup — Winner:  England Saxons
2011 Rugby World Cup - Americas qualification

Oceania
2008 Tri Nations Series — Winner: 
2008 Pacific Nations Cup — Winner:

South America
2007-2008 South American Rugby Championship "A"
2008 South American Rugby Championship "B"
2011 Rugby World Cup - Americas qualification

Major domestic tournaments

Africa
2008 Super 14 — Crusaders
2008 Currie Cup —

Asia
2007-08 Top League — Suntory Sungoliath

Europe
2007-08 Guinness Premiership — London Wasps
2007-08 National Division One — Northampton Saints
2007-08 Top 14 — Toulouse
2007-08 Rugby Pro D2 — Toulon win the championship and automatic promotion, and Mont-de-Marsan win the promotion playoff.
2007–08 Celtic League — Leinster
Super 10 — Calvisano
2007-08 Heineken Cup — Munster

North America
2008 North America 4

Oceania
2008 Air New Zealand Cup — Canterbury
2008 Super 14 — Crusaders
2008 Pacific Rugby Cup

South America
2008 Nacional de Clubes

International results

 Complete list of fixtures involving national teams during 2008.
 • - International Friendly (a fixture not affiliated to any international tournament.)
 ♦ - World Cup Qualifying matches.

January

February

March

April

May

June

July

August

September

October

November

December

Other Test Match results

All months

References

See also
2008 in sports
Rugby union in 2009

 
Years of the 21st century in rugby union